Ferne Alice McCann (born 6 August 1990) is an English model, television personality and presenter. She was a cast member of the ITVBe reality series The Only Way Is Essex, joining in the ninth series and leaving in the eighteenth. In 2015, she participated in the fifteenth series of I'm a Celebrity...Get Me Out of Here! and finished in third place. In early 2016, she became a regular showbiz reporter on This Morning. Since 2017, McCann has starred in the ITVBe reality series Ferne McCann: First Time Mum.

Career
Before her television career, McCann was the winner of Miss Essex 2012 and in the Top 15 in Miss England in 2012.

In 2013, McCann became a regular cast member on the ITV2 (now ITVBe) reality show The Only Way Is Essex making her debut in the ninth series in June 2013. She quit the show in 2016 and made her last appearance in the seventeenth series. On 15 November 2015, it was confirmed that McCann would be participating in the fifteenth series of I'm a Celebrity...Get Me Out of Here!. She arrived as a late arrival alongside Vicky Pattison and Spencer Matthews. She finished in third place on 6 December. During the final, McCann had to eat a live water spider as part of a bushtucker trial, which generated nearly 1,500 complaints to Ofcom. These were later cleared in January 2016.

In March 2016, it was announced that McCann would star as Myrtle Wilson in the Union Theatre's production of The Great Gatsby. From May 2016, McCann began making regular appearances on the Channel 5 chat-show Up Late with Rylan hosted by Rylan Clark-Neal. In February 2017, she began appearing in Celebs Go Dating on E4 alongside her TOWIE co-star Joey Essex and I'm a Celebrity campmate Jorgie Porter. As of 2017, McCann stars in the ITVBe documentary series Ferne McCann: First Time Mum, a series about her experiences as a single mother with her child.

McCann was one of four finalists who completed series 4 of Celebrity SAS: Who Dares Wins.

Personal life
McCann was in a relationship with The Only Way Is Essex co-star Charlie Sims for six years. She was linked with George Shelley on I'm a Celebrity...Get Me Out of Here! and praised him a few months later when he came out as bisexual in February 2016 claiming 'it was his way of taking control'. She also holds a PCV licence after completing training in an effort to encourage more female bus drivers.

In January 2019, it was reported that McCann had been questioned by police after an altercation took place at the 24th National Television Awards between Love Island star Adam Collard and his partner Zara McDermott. Collard later stated that he planned to release the CCTV of the incident to show that McCann was at fault.

Relationship with Arthur Collins
McCann was dating former businessman and scaffolder Arthur Collins when in April 2017 he was arrested and charged in connection with a nightclub acid attack in London. On 2 November 2017, she gave birth to a girl, Sunday.  On 13 November 2017, Collins was found guilty of five counts of grievous bodily harm and nine of actual bodily harm at Wood Green Crown Court. On 19 December 2017, Collins was jailed for twenty years, with another five years on licence. He later admitted to smuggling a mobile phone into prison so that he could speak to her. In January 2018, it was reported that McCann had liked a photo on Instagram which called for Collins' release.

In November 2022, voice notes featuring a woman's voice were leaked anonymously, allegedly revealing McCann making derogatory comments about Arthur Collins's acid attack victims. McCann published a public apology on Instagram, apologising to "all the victims of Arthur Collins's abhorrent actions in 2017" and adding that the voice messages were "manipulated; edited and taken entirely out of context."

Filmography

References

External links
 

Living people
1990 births
English people of Irish descent
English television personalities
People from Basildon
I'm a Celebrity...Get Me Out of Here! (British TV series) participants